Hermann Gustav Settegast (30 April 1819 in Königsberg - 11 August 1908 in Berlin) was a German agronomist. He established the first agricultural school in Germany that was independent of a university and is considered to be one of the 19th century's foremost experts on animal breeding.

References 
 Alfred Oehlke: Hermann Settegast. Sein Leben, Wollen und Wirken. Eine biographische Studie. Alfred Unger, Berlin 1904.
 Alfred Oehlke: Hermann Settegast. In: Schlesische Lebensbilder. Vol.2, 1926, pgs.242–246.

1819 births
1908 deaths
German agronomists
Animal breeders
German farmers